Edward Wingfield may refer to:

 Edward Maria Wingfield (1550–1631), English colonist in America
 Sir Edward Wingfield of Kimbolton (died 1603), English politician
 Edward Wingfield, 2nd Viscount Powerscourt (1729–1764), Irish politician
 Sir Edward Wingfield (civil servant) (1834–1910), British civil servant